Ulsan Culture & Arts Center is an arts center located in Dal-dong, Nam-gu, Ulsan, South Korea. Construction of the building began in 1990 and the center opened on 5 October 1995. It was previously named the Jonghap Culture & Arts Center but was renamed in 1997. It is the site of the annual Cheoyong Culture Festival, which accompanies the Ulsan World Music Festival and the Asia Pacific Music Meeting.

Facilities 

Large theatre 
The grand theatre has a capacity of 1,484 people. There is an orchestra pit and a revolving stage that can be raised or lowered. It is used for many types of performances, including opera, ballet, musicals and general theatre.

Small theatre 
The small theatre has 472 seats and is used for chamber music performances and theater and dance performances that require only a small, open space.

Outdoor theatre 
There is an outdoor theatre that can seat up to 650 people and is used for traditional art performances and general musical performances.

Exhibition hall 
Four exhibition halls are used to display paintings, sculptures, calligraphy, photography, crafts, and other exhibits.

Other facilities 
There is a crèche for audiences with children, a cafeteria, rehearsal halls and rooms, and an information kiosk to assist with visitor questions. Parking is available on site.

See also 

 List of South Korean tourist attractions

References

External links 
 Official website 
 Official site of the Cheoyong Culture Festival, Ulsan World Music Festival and Asia Pacific Music Meeting

1995 establishments in South Korea
Buildings and structures in Ulsan
Event venues established in 1995
Convention centers in South Korea
Tourist attractions in Ulsan
Nam District, Ulsan